Peter Askim is an American composer of modern classical music, conductor, music educator and a double bassist.

Background
Born in Denmark, to a Norwegian father and an American mother, he grew up in Cumberland, Maine. He studied at the Hochschule für Musik und Darstellende Kunst in Vienna, and holds bachelors, masters and doctoral degrees from Yale University. He also holds a Doctor of Musical Arts degree in Composition from the University of Texas at Austin.

He studied composition with Dan Welcher, Donald Grantham, Anthony Davis,
Jan Radzynkski, Syd Hodkinson and David Finko. His double bass instructors
were George Rubino, Diana Gannett, Donald Palma, Wolfgang Harrer and
Ludwig Streicher.

Musical career
Active as a composer, conductor and double bassist, Peter Askim is currently the Music Director and Composer-in-Residence of the Idyllwild Arts Academy. He has been a member of the Honolulu Symphony Orchestra, and served on the faculty of the University of Hawaii at Manoa, where he directed the Contemporary Music Ensemble and taught bass, theory and composition.
Numerous orchestras, music festivals and performers have commissioned
work from Askim, including the Tokyo Symphony Orchestra, the Honolulu Symphony, Orchestra Asia-Japan, The Yale Symphony Orchestra, the Idyllwild
Arts Orchestra, the Portland Chamber Music Festival, Serenata Santa Fe, Metropolitan Opera soprano Lauren Flanigan, and Grammy-nominated soprano
Judith Kellock. His compositions are published by Liben Music Publishers,
Discordia Music and the International Society of Bassists. His music is
recorded on the Gasparo and Albany labels.

As a conductor, Askim has served as Music Director of Branford Chamber
Orchestra, and makes frequent guest conducting appearances, including the
Wroclaw (Poland) Chamber Orchestra Sotto Voce and the Honolulu Symphony Orchestra. He has premiered numerous works: most recently Swansong by Richard Danielpour.

He is a frequent recitalist for the International Society of Bassists and the International Contrabass Festival. He was a guest recitalist and
teacher at the World Bass Festival in Wroclaw, Poland. He has also
received critical praise as a jazz artist in JazzTimes, the New York Post and New York Newsday.

Selected works

Islands: Concerto for Double Bass and String Orchestra
Moving, Still for Orchestra
As Glaciers Thaw... for String Orchestra
...but the rain... for Shakuhachi and 21-string Koto
Eight Solitudes for Bass and Piano
Edge for Solo Double Bass
Meridians for Orchestra

References

External links



1971 births
20th-century classical composers
21st-century classical composers
American male classical composers
American classical composers
American classical double-bassists
Male double-bassists
Living people
Danish emigrants to the United States
University of Music and Performing Arts Vienna alumni
Yale School of Music alumni
People from Cumberland, Maine
21st-century American composers
20th-century American composers
21st-century double-bassists
20th-century American male musicians
21st-century American male musicians